Creatura nuda (Nude Creature) is the first album from Italian singer Valentina Giovagnini. It was released on 15 March 2002.

Track list
Senza origine
Creatura nuda
Il passo silenzioso della neve
Metamorfosi
Mi fai vivere
Madrigale
Il trono dei pazzi
La formula
Accarezzando a piedi nudi l'erba delle colline di Donegal
Libera
Dovevo dire di no (il traffico dei sensi)
Senza origine (Allemanda)

Singles
 "Il passo silenzioso della neve / Dovevo dire di no (il traffico dei sensi) / Accarezzando a piedi nudi le colline di Donegal / Il passo silenzioso della neve (base)" (2002, #14)
 "Senza origine" (2002, Promo - Radio)
 "Creatura nuda" (2002 Promo - Radio)

2002 albums
Valentina Giovagnini albums